Sângeorgiu de Mureș is a commune in Mureș County, Transylvania, Romania composed of three villages: Cotuș (Csejd), Sângeorgiu de Mureș, and Tofalău (Tófalva).

Geography
The commune is situated on the Transylvanian Plateau, on the left bank of the Mureș River. It forms part of the Târgu Mureș metropolitan area.

Demographics
The commune has a Hungarian majority. According to the 2011 census, it has a population of 9,304 of which 50.31% are Hungarian, 36.92% are Romanian, and 7.94% Romani.

See also 
 List of Hungarian exonyms (Mureș County)

References

Communes in Mureș County
Localities in Transylvania